William Grubb may refer to:
 William Irwin Grubb, American judge
 William Dawson Grubb, Tasmanian politician, lawyer, and investor